Galesh Kolam (also Romanized as Gālesh Kolām, Gālesh Kalām, and Gālesh Kolam) is a village in Gel-e Sefid Rural District, in the Central District of Langarud County, Gilan Province, Iran. At the 2006 census, its population was 664, in 212 families.

References 

Populated places in Langarud County